Osvaldo Rodrigues da Cunha (6 April 1928 – 11 March 2011) was a Brazilian paleontologist and herpetologist.
Da Cunha was born in Belém, and studied zoology at the Instituto Nacional de Pesquisas da Amazônia (INPA) of Manaus.

Selected works

Authored Taxa

Amapasaurus tetradactylus 
Atractus albuquerquei 
Atractus alphonsehogei 
Atractus snethlageae 
Colobosauroides cearensis 
Gonatodes eladioi 
Kinosternon scorpioides carajasensis 
Liophis carajasensis 
Micrurus paraensis 
Oxyrhopus melanogenys orientalis 
Placosoma cipoense

Eponyms
Cunha is commemorated in the scientific names of two species of reptiles: Amphisbaena cunhai , a species of worm lizard; and Loxopholis osvaldoi , a species of spectacled lizard.

References

External links

Vilar, Lucila; Santos, Diego; Bayma, Lílian (2011). "Museu Goeldi perde um dos seus mais importantes pesquisadores ". Consulted: 2010-03-24. (in Portuguese).
Ramos Feijó, Maria Inês (2011). "Discurso em homenagem ao pesquisador Oswaldo Cunha ". Proferido por Maria Inês Ramos Feijó, da Coordenação de Ciências da Terra e Ecologia do Museu Paraense Emílio Goeldi (MPEG). Consulted: 2010-03-24. (in Portuguese).

Brazilian paleontologists
Brazilian herpetologists
1930 births
2011 deaths